Asiab Jub (also Romanized as Āsīāb Jūb; also known as Āsīāb Jūb-e Amjadī) is a village in Agahan Rural District, Kolyai District, Sonqor County, Kermanshah Province, Iran. At the 2006 census, its population was 83, in 17 families.

References 

Populated places in Sonqor County